Jaine is a given name and surname. Notable people with this name include

Given name

Female names
Jaine Fenn, British author
Jaine Green, British filmmaker and comedian

Male names
Jaine Barreiro (born 1994), Colombian footballer
Jaine Lindo (born 1990), St. Maartener footballer

Surname
Tom Jaine (born 1943), British publisher

See also

Jayne
Jane (given name)
Jain (disambiguation)
Jaime

Lists of people by surname
Lists of people by given name